Winter Quarters may refer to:
Winter Quarters (North Omaha, Nebraska), an 1846-1847 Latter-day Saints encampment
Winter Quarters Nebraska Temple, an LDS Church temple operating since 2001 at the encampment site
Winter Quarters State Historic Site, in Louisiana
Wallace Circus and American Circus Corporation Winter Quarters, Peru, Indiana, listed on the NRHP in Indiana
Cantonment, the establishment of temporary military encampments during winter